Woodburn, Virginia may refer to:

 Woodburn, Fairfax County, Virginia
 Woodburn, Loudoun County, Virginia